Murexsul kieneri is a species of sea snail, a marine gastropod mollusk in the family Muricidae, the murex snails or rock snails.

Description

Distribution

References

 Kiener, L.-C., 1842–43 – Genre Rocher (Murex), Linné. Volume 7. In: Spécies général et iconographie des coquilles vivantes. Famille des canalifères, p. 130 pp
 Houart, R.; Kilburn, R. N. & Marais, A. P. (2010). Muricidae. pp. 176–270, in: Marais A.P. & Seccombe A.D. (eds), Identification guide to the seashells of South Africa. Volume 1. Groenkloof: Centre for Molluscan Studies. 376 pp

External links
 Reeve, L. A. (1845-1849). Monograph of the genus Murex. In: Conchologia Iconica: or, illustrations of the shells of molluscous animals, vol. 3, pls 1-37 and unpaginated text. L. Reeve & Co., London

Muricidae
Gastropods described in 1845